Sebastián de Perea or Sebastián de Pesca (died 20 September 1607) was a Roman Catholic prelate who served as Auxiliary Bishop of Seville (1587–1607).

On 27 April 1587, Sebastián de Perea was appointed by Pope Sixtus V as Auxiliary Bishop of Seville and Titular Bishop of Medaurus. He served as Auxiliary Bishop of Seville until his death on 20 Sep 1607.

References

External links and additional sources
 (for Chronology of Bishops) 
 (for Chronology of Bishops) 

1607 deaths
16th-century Roman Catholic bishops in Spain
17th-century Roman Catholic bishops in Spain
Bishops appointed by Pope Sixtus V